Lower Granite Lake is a reservoir created by Lower Granite Dam. The dam is a concrete gravity run-of-the-river dam in the northwest United States. On the lower Snake River in southeastern Washington, it bridges Whitman and Garfield counties.

Lower Granite Dam is part of the Columbia River Basin system of dams, built and operated by the United States Army Corps of Engineers; power generated is distributed by the Bonneville Power Administration.

The first barge to Portland on the  navigation route was loaded with wheat and departed Lewiston on August 9, 1975.'

Bridges 

 Southway Bridge - crosses between Lewiston, Idaho and Clarkston, Washington
 Interstate Highway Bridge - also crosses between Lewiston and Clarkston, carrying U.S. Route 12 between the cities

Photos 

 commons:Category:Confluence of the Snake River and the Clearwater River

References 

Reservoirs in Washington (state)
Lewiston, Idaho